Ali Chebah (born September 30, 1985) is a French-Algerian professional boxer in the light welterweight division.

Chebah was born in Mont-Saint-Aignan, Seine-Maritime, France and is French Algerian.

On November 10, 2007, he became the interim WBC Youth World light welterweight champion by beating Wellington De Jesus by 3rd-round TKO.

He waits for a fight with Ajose Olusegun for the WBC interim title.

References

1985 births
Living people
French sportspeople of Algerian descent
French male boxers
Light-welterweight boxers